Just before Dark is a live album by Mike Viola that was released in 2005. In addition to being on CD, it has also been released on vinyl.

Track listing
 "Hair of the Dog" - 3:20
 "Sandi Bright" - 3:23
 "Number Crunch" - 3:00
 "Sound of My Own Voice" - 2:50
 "Sun Drenched - 3:17
 "A Way to Say Goodbye" - 3:06
 "Clusterfuck" - 3:46
 "Rowing Song" - 3:31
 "Just before Dark" - 2:19

References

2005 live albums
Mike Viola albums